Shuanggui is a town under the administration of Jialing District, Nanchong, Sichuan, China. , it has two residential neighborhoods and 15 villages under its administration:
Neighborhoods
Guihua Community
Shilou Community

Villages
Guanyintang Village
Fengxiangshan Village
Sanlongchang Village
Dashigou Village
Longguiyuan Village
Dalingshan Village
Fanjiaqiao Village
Changlesi Village
Taihe Village
Dengjiagou Village
Houjiagou Village
Changtanba Village
Luojiasi Village
Madashan Village
Yuanjiadian Village

Shuanggui was formed in 2020 by merging the former Taihe Township and Shilou Township.

References 

Township-level divisions of Sichuan
Nanchong